The École Spéciale de Mécanique et d'Electricité (English: Special School of Mechanics and Electricity), also known as ESME Sudria is a French private grande école founded in 1905. It is a part of the IONIS Education Group.

Founded in 1905 by Joachim Sudria and certified by the State since 1922, the diploma is signed by the French Education Ministry and authorized by the "Commission des titres d'ingénieur". The ESME-Sudria is also member of the "Conférence des Grandes Écoles" and of the Union of Independent Grandes Écoles. Students & graduates of the school are called the Sussus.

The school graduates students at different levels:
 Bachelor of Science
 Master of Engineering certified by the Order of Engineers  
 PhD (cooperation with University of Paris-Est Marne-la-Vallée or University of Paris-Saclay)

Since 2006, the school has been part of the IONIS Institute of Technology from IONIS Education Group.

In 2014, the university will open a new campus in Beijing and a Mastère en sciences course in partnership with the Beijing Institute of Petrochemical Technology.

Dean history

Alumni 
 Daniel Klein (1975), MBA at Duke University, former Vice-President of Siemens 
 Alain Goga (1976) CEO of Alstom Transport
 Marie-Louise Paris (1921), founder of the EPF in 1925
 Marc Sellam (1974), founder and president of IONIS Education Group (more than 20,000 students) in 1980	
 Bernard Di Tullio (1974), former CEO of Technip (CAC40 company)

References

External links 
ESME-Sudria website

Engineering universities and colleges in France
Grandes écoles
Universities and colleges in Lille
Universities and colleges in Lyon
Universities and colleges in Paris
Universities and colleges in Bordeaux
Educational institutions established in 1905
1905 establishments in France